Hilarographa celebesiana is a species of moth of the family Tortricidae. It is found on Sulawesi.

The wingspan is about 16 mm. The costal area of the forewings is orange rust. The lines are orange, but more yellow towards the base. The hindwings are dark brown with yellowish white in males and yellowish orange extending into the anal field in females.

Etymology
The species is named after its native island, Celebes, now named Sulawesi.

References

Moths described in 2009
Hilarographini